The Mixed team ski cross competition at the FIS Freestyle Ski and Snowboarding World Championships 2023 was held on 26 February 2023.

Results

Pre-heat

Semifinals

Heat 1

Heat 2

Finals

Small final

Big final

References

Mixed team ski cross